Barsley is a surname. Notable people with the surname include:

 Dave Barsley, Australian rugby league footballer
 Jason Barsley (born 1978), Australian rugby league footballer
 Vaila Barsley (born 1987), Scottish footballer

See also
 Bansley